Arnulf III of Boulogne (died 990) was a son of Arnulf II, Count of Boulogne. He succeeded his father as Count of Boulogne from 972 to 990.  On his death his lands were divided among his three sons:
Baldwin received Boulogne
Arnulf received Ternois
a third son received Thérouanne.

990 deaths
10th-century French people
Counts of Boulogne
House of Flanders
Year of birth unknown